H23 or H-23 may refer to:
 H-23 Raven, a 1948 American three-place, light observation helicopter
 HMS H23, a 1918 British Royal Navy submarine which saw service during World War I
 HMS Echo (H23), a 1934 British Royal Navy destroyer which saw service during World War II

Ship disambiguation pages